The Classical World Chess Championship 2000, known at the time as the Braingames World Chess Championships, was held from 8 October 2000 – 4 November 2000 in London, United Kingdom. Garry Kasparov, the defending champion, played Vladimir Kramnik. The match was played in a best-of-16-games format, with Kramnik defeating the heavily favoured Kasparov. Kramnik won the match with two wins, 13 draws and no losses. To the supporters of the lineal world championship, Kramnik became the 14th world chess champion.

Background

Following the split in the world chess championship in 1993, there were two rival world titles: the official FIDE world title, and the PCA world title held by Garry Kasparov. The rationale behind Kasparov's title was that he had not been defeated in a match, but in fact had defeated the rightful challenger Nigel Short in 1993, so FIDE had no power to strip the title from him.

The PCA then held Interzonal and Candidates matches from 19931995, and Kasparov successfully defended his PCA title in 1995 against Viswanathan Anand. 

The PCA folded in 1996.  The initial contract with Intel had expired.  Kasparov was looking for a new sponsor, but hadn't been able to find one.  However, Kasparov still claimed he was the rightful world champion, so Kasparov looked for other ways to select his next challenger.

Qualification

Without the sponsorship of the PCA, Kasparov found he was unable to organise a series of qualifying matches to choose a challenger. Eventually in 1998, he announced that, based on their ratings and results, Anand and Vladimir Kramnik were clearly the next two best players in the world, and that they would play a match to decide who would challenge for Kasparov's title.

Anand, however, as a participant in the FIDE world championship cycle, believed he was contractually obligated to not participate in a rival cycle and declined the offer. So instead a match was organised between Kramnik and Alexei Shirov, from 24 May to 5 June 1998 in Cazorla, Spain. Shirov was chosen because he was next in the PCA rating list, and because of his strong performance at the Linares 1998 supertournament. 

Despite being the underdog, Shirov won the match with two wins, seven draws and no losses.

{| class="wikitable" style="text-align:center"
|+World Chess Championship Candidates Match (1998)
|-
! !! Rating !! 1 !! 2 !! 3 !! 4 !! 5 !! 6 !! 7 !! 8 !! 9 !! Total
|-
| align=left |  || 2790
| ½ ||style="background:black; color:white"| ½ || ½ ||style="background:black; color:white"| 0 || ½ ||style="background:black; color:white"| ½ || ½ ||style="background:black; color:white"| ½ || 0 || 3½
|-
| align=left |  || 2710
|style="background:black; color:white"| ½ || ½ ||style="background:black; color:white"| ½ || 1 ||style="background:black; color:white"| ½ || ½ ||style="background:black; color:white"| ½ || ½ ||style="background:black; color:white"| 1 || 5½
|}

However, during 1998 Kasparov, Shirov and sponsors were unable to come to an agreement. Shirov rejected one offer of a match in California, but believed rejecting this offer did not mean waiving his rights for a match. In December 1998, there was still talk of organising a KasparovShirov match.

In February 1999, Kasparov abandoned plans for a match with Shirov and pursued a match with Anand instead, on the basis that Anand was second to Kasparov on the ratings list.  Negotiations for a 1999 match failed, as did negotiations in 2000, with Anand expressing dissatisfaction with the contract. In March 2000 it was announced that negotiations with Anand had failed and so Kasparov would negotiate a match with the next player in the ratings list—Kramnik. This time negotiations were successful, and the company Braingames was formed to finance a Kasparov-Kramnik match in October 2000.

Shirov was aggrieved, and even in 2006 maintained that Kramnik was not a valid world champion. However, most supporters of Kasparov's title believe that, despite the unsatisfactory way in which a challenger was chosen, nevertheless the winner of this match would be the true World Champion. Kramnik had a far better record against Kasparov than Shirov did (a point Kasparov emphasised when the match was announced in April 2000). In the years that followed, Kasparov maintained an overwhelming plus score in his individual games against Shirov.

Championship Match

{| class="wikitable" style="text-align:center"
|+Classical World Chess Championship Match 2000
|-
! !! Rating !! 1 !! 2 !! 3 !! 4 !! 5 !! 6 !! 7 !! 8 !! 9 !! 10 !! 11 !! 12 !! 13 !! 14 !! 15 !! Total
|-
| align=left |  || 2849
| ½ ||style="background:black; color:white"| 0 || ½ ||style="background:black; color:white"| ½ || ½ ||style="background:black; color:white"| ½ || ½ ||style="background:black; color:white"| ½ || ½ ||style="background:black; color:white"| 0 || ½ ||style="background:black; color:white"| ½ || ½ ||style="background:black; color:white"| ½ || ½ || 6½
|-
| align=left |  || 2772
|style="background:black; color:white"| ½ || 1 ||style="background:black; color:white"| ½ || ½ ||style="background:black; color:white"| ½ || ½ ||style="background:black; color:white"| ½ || ½ ||style="background:black; color:white"| ½ || 1 
|style="background:black; color:white"| ½ || ½ ||style="background:black; color:white"| ½ || ½ ||style="background:black; color:white"| ½ || 8½
|}

Match games

According to Kasparov, Kramnik's victory stemmed from his superior opening preparation. He relied on the Berlin Defence of the Ruy Lopez to defuse Kasparov's 1.e4, an opening Kasparov was not prepared for. Kramnik also won Game 2 with a new idea for White in Kasparov's favourite Grünfeld Defence, which Kramnik discovered during training with Boris Gelfand a year before the match. He also won Game 10 due to deep knowledge of 4.e3 variation by Joël Lautier and Evgeny Bareev, his seconds; that variation was chosen because of Kasparov's unimpressive score with it.

Aftermath
The Berlin defense surged in popularity after this match, becoming a reliable drawing weapon. Kramnik defended his title in the Classical World Chess Championship 2004 against Peter Leko. The world championship remained split until 2006, when Kramnik defeated FIDE champion Veselin Topalov in a reunification match, becoming the undisputed world chess champion.

See also
List of chess games between Kasparov and Kramnik

References

2000 Classical
2000 in chess
2000 in London
Chess in the United Kingdom
Chess in London